The Luxembourg Sandstone (French: Grès de Luxembourg) is a geologic formation in Luxembourg. It exists along the eastern margin of the Paris Basin. Sandstone units continuous with the Luxembourg Sandstone also occur in France. It is Early Jurassic in age. It predominantly outcrops in a belt extending through south-central Luxembourg.  It up to 100 metres thick and predominantly consists of carbonaceous poorly cemented sandstone and sandy limestone

Fossil content 
Among others, the following fossils were reported from the formation:

Reptiles
 Ichthyosaurus communis
 Temnodontosaurus sp.
 Neotheropoda indet.
 Plesiosauria indet.
 cf. Theropoda indet.

Fish
 Halonodon luxembourgensis
 Hybodontidae indet.

Gastropods
 Pleurotomaria cognata
 P. hennocquii
 P. hettangiensis
 P. wanderbachi
 Ptychomphalus caepa
 P. wehenkeli
 Scurriopsis (Hennocquia) hettangiensis
 Scurriopsis (Scurriopsis) schmidti
 Trochotoma clypeus

See also 
 List of fossiliferous stratigraphic units in Luxembourg

References

Bibliography 
 D. Delsate and M. D. Ezcurra. 2014. The first Early Jurassic (late Hettangian) theropod dinosaur remains from the Grand Duchy of Luxembourg. Geologica Belgica 17(2):175-181
 S. Monari, M. Valentini, and M. A. Conti. 2011. Earliest Jurassic patellogastropod, vetigastropod, and neritimorph gastropods from Luxembourg with considerations on the Triassic–Jurassic faunal turnover. Acta Palaeontologica Polonica 56:349-384
 P. Godefroit. 1995. Un crâne d'Ichthyosaurus communis (Reptilia, Ichthyosauria) du Sinémurien supérieur de Lorraine belge. Bulletin de Société belge de Géologie 104(1-2):77-89
 G. Bloos. 1994. Frühe Arietitidae (Ammonoidea) aus dem Hettangium (Angulata-Zone, Unt. Lias) von Württemberg (SW-Deutschland). Stuttgarter Beiträge zur Naturkunde, Serie B (Geologie und Paläontologie) 219:1-67
 C. J. Duffin and D. Delsate. 1993. A new myriacanthid holocephalan (Chondrichthyes) from the Early Jurassic of Luxembourg. Neues Jahrbuch für Geologie und Paläontologie, Monatshefte 1993(11):669-680

Further reading 
 H. Meier and K. Meiers. 1988. Die Gastropodenfauna der "Angulata-Zone" des Steinbruchs "Reckingerwald" bei Brouch. Travaux Scientifiques du Musée National d'Histoire Naturelle de Luxembourg 13:1-88

Geology of Luxembourg
Jurassic System of Europe
Early Jurassic Europe
Hettangian Stage
Sinemurian Stage
Sandstone formations
Paleontology in Luxembourg